Pier Giorgio Cazzola (4 March 1937 – 21 January 2001) was an Italian sprinter, that finished 4th with the national relay team on 4x100 metres relay at the 1960 Olympic Games.

Biography
Cazzola was born in Vicenza. He participated at one edition of the Summer Olympics (1960) and had nine caps in national team from 1957 to 1961.

Achievements

See also
 Italy national relay team

References

External links
 

1937 births
2001 deaths
Italian male sprinters
Athletes (track and field) at the 1960 Summer Olympics
Olympic athletes of Italy
Sportspeople from Vicenza
Athletics competitors of Fiamme Oro